Arun Nalawade is an Indian film and theater personality. He has worked in BEST Undertaking. He is co-producer of Shwaas: the film that won the Golden Lotus India's National Film Award for Best Feature Film for the year 2003, he also acted in the film. Nalawade played Anna Hazare in the Marathi film Mala anna vhaychay.

Arun Nalawade was born and raised in Girgaon Chawl, Mumbai. he started working in plays since the age of 20. He did characters of aged roles than his real age roles. The actor has worked in all the three mediums – films, TV and theaters, Arun Nalawade Directed Film Tatwa.

Filmography  
 Shwaas
 Swarajya
 Resham Gaath
 Akheracha Purava
 Akalpit
 Pailteer
 Kaydyacha Bola
 Kshan
 Samar Ek Sangharsh
 Raasta Roko
 Hi Poragi Konaachi
 Hirava Chuda
 Ghaat Pratighaat
 Paash
 Pahile Paul
 Fakira
 Saade Maade Tin
 Daughter
 Tahaan
 Maazi Shaala
 Nakshatra
 Baaimanus
 Aaghaat
 Arjun (2011 film)
 Ringan
 Svatantryachi Aishi Taishi
 Laagali Paij
 Mahasatta
 Har Har Mahadev
 Gojiri
 Sakhyare
 Topi Ghala Re
 Saasarchi Ka Maherchi
 Punyavaan Me
 Sahvaas
 Paris
 Pune via Bihar
 Phala
 Shree Siddhivinayak Mahima
 Teecha Baap Tyacha Baap
 Arre... Devaa
 Gaav Maza Tantamukt
 Divasen Divas
 Aai Tuza Aashirvaad
 Aai ga!
 Aatta Ga Baya
 Anna Hazare
 Palakhi
 Labad Kuthali
 Sanjparva
 Saad
 Shoor Amhi Sardaar
 Maazi Shala
 Aanandi
 Taani
 Braveheart
 Sandook
 Carry On Maratha TandavSimmba Kay Zala Kalana 
 Surya''

TV serials    
 Man Udu Udu Zhala as Manohar Deshpande
 Avaghachi Sansar as Dhanaji Mane
 Majhya Navryachi Bayko as Ramchandra Damle (Nanaji)
 Ka Re Durava as Ketkar Kaka
 Abhalmaya
 Vadalvaat
 Jigarbaaz as Meshram Sir
 Bheti Lagi Jeeva
 Vasudha
 Kimayagaar
 Ran Manus
 Nati Goti
 Police File
 Gahire Pani
 Reshimgathi
 Rath Chanderi
 Saripat Ha Sansaracha
 Ek Ha Asa Dhaga Sukhacha
 Tan Tana Tan
 Bhumika
 Kalokh
 Aapali Manase
 Baba
 Bin Bhintinche Ghar
 Shubham Karoti
 Kalay Tasmai Namah
 Swapnanchya Palikadale
 Yeah Duniya hai Rangeen
 Lifeline
 Baabul Ki Duae Leti ja
 Smile Please

Plays 
 Tera Divas Premache 
 Shunyacha Parabhav
 Abda Shabda
 Temple Employment
 Kalpravah
 Manu Ani Masa
 Vyasancha Kayakalpa
 Ghost
 I Confess
 Kaalsutra
 Suras Ani Chamatkarik
 Moruche Pollution
 Hunger Strike
 Mhay
 Mahabhartache Uttarramayan
 Queue
 Ravnayan
 Rope Trick
 The Escape
 Ushir Hotoy
 Shraddha
 Ratra Aarambha
 Surkutya

References

Living people
Film producers from Mumbai
Male actors from Mumbai
20th-century Indian male actors
Producers who won the Best Feature Film National Film Award
Male actors in Marathi television
1963 births